Eschscholzia caespitosa is a species of poppy known by the common names foothill poppy, tufted poppy and collarless California poppy.

It is native to western North America from Oregon, across California, to Baja California where it is a member of the chaparral plant community.

Description
Eschscholzia caespitosa is an annual herb which is quite similar in appearance to its relative, the California poppy.

External links
CalFlora Database: Eschscholzia caespitosa (Foothill poppy,  Tufted Poppy, tufted eschscholzia)
Jepson Manual treatment of Eschscholzia caespitosa
USDA Plants Profile for Eschscholzia caespitosa
UC Photos gallery — Eschscholzia caespitosa

caespitosa
Flora of California
Flora of Baja California
Flora of Oregon
Flora of the Cascade Range
Flora of the Sierra Nevada (United States)
Natural history of the California chaparral and woodlands
Natural history of the California Coast Ranges
Natural history of the Central Valley (California)
Natural history of the Peninsular Ranges
Natural history of the San Francisco Bay Area
Natural history of the Santa Monica Mountains
Natural history of the Transverse Ranges
Flora without expected TNC conservation status